Helsingistä maailman toiselle puolen – Parhaat 2007–2012 is the first compilation album of the Finnish pop rock band Haloo Helsinki!. Released on 9 November 2012, the album peaked at number 49 on the Finnish Albums Chart.

Track listing

Charts

References

2013 compilation albums
Haloo Helsinki! albums
Finnish-language albums